Clastoptera is a genus of spittlebugs in the family Clastopteridae. There are at least 30 described species in Clastoptera.

See also
 List of Clastoptera species

References

 Murray, Hanna (1970). "An annotated list of the spittlebugs of Michigan (Homoptera: Cercopidae)". The Michigan Entomologist, vol. 3, no. 1, 2-16.

Further reading

External links
 NCBI Taxonomy Browser, Clastoptera

Clastopteridae